Sleepless in Seattle: The Birth of Grunge is a various artists compilation album released on February 7, 2006 by Livewire Recordings. The album features a sixteen-page booklet of liner notes written by Clark Humphrey that details the history of the Seattle music scene from the mid 80s to early 90s.

Reception

Steve Leggett of AllMusic calls Sleepless in Seattle: The Birth of Grunge "a nice set from a fascinating era." David Browne of Entertainment Weekly praised the remastered music and called the album a "compilation of unruly Northwestern hard rock of the '80s and '90s is a valuable reminder that Seattle gave us more than Nirvana." The Louisville Eccentric Observer claimed "what's here is empirical, historical documentation that a movement had been afoot long before Kurt Cobain's sad, snarling blue eyes looked through you."

Tim Perlich NOW was critical of Sleepless in Seattle'''s the track selection and said "a Seattle grunge comp without Mudhoney's Touch Me I'm Sick is one you don't need." Seattle Weekly criticized the aesthetics of the liner notes but warmly received the music, saying "the whole thing flows like a prized mixtape."

Track listing

Personnel
Adapted from the Sleepless in Seattle: The Birth of Grunge'' liner notes.

 Colin Cobb – executive-producer
 Clark Humphrey – production, compiling
 Emily Lazar – remastering
 Steve Moriarty – photography
 Ted Myers – production
 Charles Peterson – photography
 Mark Pollock – art director, design

Release history

References

External links 
 Sleepless in Seattle: The Birth of Grunge at Discogs (list of releases)

2006 compilation albums
Alternative rock compilation albums
Grunge compilation albums